Gadiel Katanga Lenini is an  Anglican bishop in Kenya: He is the current Bishop of Taita–Taveta.

References

21st-century Anglican bishops of the Anglican Church of Kenya
Anglican bishops of Kajiado
Living people
Year of birth missing (living people)